The Race of Champions is a greyhound racing competition held annually at the Kingdom Greyhound Stadium in Tralee, County Kerry, Ireland.

Race history
It was inaugurated in 2008 and therefore is a relatively new event but due to the significant winners prize money on offer stands as a feature event in the Irish racing calendar. The event offers one of the richest prizes for a one-off race. In 2019, the competition was sponsored by Navillus and previous to that was sponsored by Boylesports and served as a major fundraiser for the Kerry GAA training fund, while showcasing how the greyhound industry plays a pivotal role in the local community.

The event has been won a record five times by Graham Holland.

Past winners

Venues & Distances
2008-present (Tralee 550y)

Sponsors
2008–2011 (Paddy O'Sullivan)
2012–2012 (Betdaq)
2013–2017 (Boylesports)
2018–2018 (Kerry G.A.A Supporters)
2019–2019 (Navillus)
2021–2021 (S.I.S)
2022–present (Denis Murphy)

References

Greyhound racing competitions in Ireland
Sport in County Kerry
Sport in Tralee
Recurring sporting events established in 2008